Legislative Assembly elections were held in Sikkim, in October 1999, to elect the 32 members of the sixth Legislative Assembly.

Results

Elected members

References

State Assembly elections in Sikkim
1990s in Sikkim
1999 State Assembly elections in India